Bern or Berne is the capital of Switzerland.

Berne may also refer to:

Places
Berne, Germany, a town in Lower Saxony, Germany
Berne, Hamburg, Germany, a former village which became a quarter of Hamburg
Berne (Hamburg U-Bahn station), a station of Hamburg U-Bahn
Berne (Ollen), a river of Lower Saxony, Germany, tributary of the Ollen
Berne, Indiana, a city in Indiana, USA

People with the surname
Eric Berne, Canadian psychiatrist
Josef Berne, Russian-born American writer, film director and producer
Tim Berne, American jazz saxophonist and composer

See also
Bern (disambiguation)
Bernie (disambiguation)
Berny (disambiguation)
Burn (disambiguation)